The Uruguayan Immortal is a game of chess played in the 1943 Uruguayan Chess Championship between B. Molinari and Luis Roux Cabral. The game is famous for the brilliant combination play of Cabral, who would become a two-time Uruguayan champion (1948 and 1971).

The game
White: Molinari  Black: Cabral  Opening: Semi-Slav Defense, Meran Variation (ECO D48)

1. d4 Nf6 2. Nf3 d5 3. c4 c6 4. Nc3 Nbd7 5. e3 e6 6. Bd3 dxc4 7. Bxc4 b5 8. Bd3 a6 9. 0-0 c5 10. b3 Bb7 11. Qe2 Qb6 12. Rd1 Be7 13. a4 b4 14. Nb1 Rc8 15. Nbd2 cxd4 16. Nc4 Qa7 17. Nxd4 0-0 18. Bd2 a5 19. Nb5 Qa8 20. Nbd6 Bxg2 21. Nxc8 Rxc8 22. Re1 Bf3 23. Qf1 Qd5 24. e4 Rxc4 25. bxc4 Qh5 26. Bf4 Ng4 27. Be2 Nde5 28. h3 Bc5 29. Bg3 Nxf2 30. Bxf2 (see diagram) Qg5+ 31. Kh2 Qf4+ 32. Bg3 Bg1+ 33. Qxg1 Ng4+

 White resigns. 

Fred Reinfeld annotated the game in the Chess Correspondent, May–June 1944, pages 11–12. His final remark was: "A game destined for immortality."

See also
 Peruvian Immortal
 Polish Immortal

References

Chess games
1943 in chess
Chess in Uruguay
1943 in Uruguayan sport
Nicknamed sporting events